The Battle of Urfa is a battle that took place between Aq Qoyunlu  and the Mamluk Sultanate in August 1480 at Urfa in Diyar Bakr (modern-day Turkey). The reason was the invasion of the Mamluks into the territory of Aq Qoyunlu to capture Urfa. During the battle, the troops of Aq Qoyunlu inflicted a crushing defeat on the Mamluks.

Background and battle 

The Mamluk Sultanate was one of the external threats of Aq Qoyunlu, whose ruler was Sultan Ya'qub Beg. The Mamluk sultan, Qaitbay, took the advantage of the death of Aq Qoyunlu's previous sultan, Uzun Hasan, and sent a 100 thousand army led by Pecheneg commander Yashbak al-Zahiri to invade Diyar Bakr. al-Zahiri, in 1480, crossed the Euphrates River and began the siege of Urfa. Sultan Ya'qub was soon informed about this and sent an army under the command of Bayindir Beg, Sulayman Beg Bijan, and Sufi Khalil Beg Mawsilu to protect Urfa. The Mamluk soldiers, who learned about the approach of the Aq Qoyunlu's troops, advised al-Zahiri to retreat, but he did not listen to them. Thus, the Mamluk army appeared before the Aq Qoyunlu army. The right side of the Mamluk army was commanded by Gansu Yakhyavi (the head of Damascus), the left side was commanded by Ozdemir (the Head of Aleppo) and the central side of the army was commanded by al-Zahiri. The battle ended with the victory of Aq Qoyunlu, during which the Mamluk troops were completely defeated. al-Zahiri, Gansu Yakhyavi and Ozdemir were taken prisoners. al-Zahiri was executed  and his head was sent to Sultan Ya'qub. The Mamluk Sultanate, after this battle, received a heavy blow, and after the loss of the commanders of the troops, the state was greatly weakened.

References

Sources 
 
 
 
 
 
 
 

Urfa
History of Turkey
Urfa
Urfa